Without a Trace is an American police procedural drama television series created by Hank Steinberg that aired on CBS from September 26, 2002 to May 19, 2009 with the total of seven seasons and 160 episodes. The series focuses the cases of a Missing Persons Unit of the Federal Bureau of Investigation (FBI) in New York City.

On May 19, 2009, CBS cancelled the series after seven seasons.

Premise
Each episode  followed the search for one individual under tight time constraints. The stories also focused on the personal lives of the team members and illustrated how their experiences gave them insight into cases. The team consisted of Jack Malone (Anthony LaPaglia), Samantha Spade (Poppy Montgomery), Vivian Johnson (Marianne Jean-Baptiste), Danny Taylor (Enrique Murciano), Martin Fitzgerald (Eric Close), and Elena Delgado (Roselyn Sánchez), the last of whom joined the cast in the fourth season.

The real FBI does investigate missing persons; specifically, they have the authority to help in any "mysterious" disappearances of children abducted by nonfamily members. The groups that investigate these crimes are called Child Abduction Rapid Deployment teams. They get involved in other missing persons cases as needed but do not have a dedicated unit. One element that set the series apart from other TV police dramas was the display of information about real-life missing persons at the end of most episodes. This resulted in a kidnapped brother and sister being found on July 25, 2005. At least five people have been found as a result of those announcements. Occasionally, such information was replaced with other public-service announcements, such as an episode about an attempted suicide that presented information on a suicide help line. Showings outside the United States tend to omit missing persons information; however, Australia's Nine Network usually showed Australian cases, and in Hong Kong, the TVB Pearl showed information about local missing persons during the first two seasons. Without a Trace took place within Jerry Bruckheimer's CSI: Crime Scene Investigation universe. A crossover episode in 2007 featured characters Gil Grissom (William Petersen) from CSI and Jack Malone from Without a Trace working together to solve the same case.

History
Without a Trace debuted as part of the CBS fall line-up in 2002, created by Hank Steinberg and produced by Jerry Bruckheimer. The show is the only primetime U.S. drama to feature two Australians (LaPaglia and Montgomery) and a Briton (Jean-Baptiste) playing Americans in the regular cast. It was the first show to achieve strong ratings opposite longtime NBC hit medical drama ER which, like Without a Trace, is produced by Warner Bros. Television.

Without a Trace ran on Thursdays at 10 pm until September 2006, when it was moved to Sundays. In the 2007–2008 season, it swapped timeslots with Shark, returning it to its old timeslot on Thursdays. However, this lasted only until the 2008–2009 season, when it moved to Tuesdays at 10pm. On May 19, 2009, the morning the series finale aired, it was announced that the show had been cancelled.

The first two showrunners were Steinberg and Ed Redlich. Between seasons two and three, Redlich moved away from active participation in the series, with staff writers Jan Nash and Greg Walker taking over. In the middle of season four, Steinberg left to produce the series The Nine, while remaining executive producer.

In 2003, the TNT Network acquired syndication rights to the series for US$1.4 million per episode. As of January 2018, Without a Trace can be seen on the basic cable channel POP and the digital TV channel Escape. It apparently airs every day in large blocks, with episodes being shown in the order of their original air dates. Info as to when the show was added to the POP line-up is currently unavailable.

Main cast

Season synopsis

Season 1

The missing persons unit is headed up by the driven but morally compromised Jack Malone, whose professional successes are marred by his complicated personal life—he is in the midst of a messy breakup from his wife, precipitated by his own infidelity with his protege, Samantha "Sam" Spade. At the outset of the series, Jack struggles to balance his crumbling marriage with the arrival of Martin Fitzgerald, a rookie agent whose placement Jack sees as a sinecure due to Fitzgerald's father being a powerful figure in the FBI. The team ultimately find themselves forced to come together and personally reckon with the legacy of 9/11 when a powerful businesswoman whose company headquarters were destroyed in the Twin Tower attacks goes missing and her kidnapper—a man whose wife was killed in the World Trade Center—abducts Jack in order to forestall her rescue.

Season 2

As the team continues to track down missing people, Jack and his wife slide towards divorce, while Jack must also care for his father (Martin Landau) who has Alzheimer's disease. The team members' life histories are revealed, including the fact that Martin was practically raised by his aunt and uncle, and Danny is an orphan whose estranged brother Rafael (Alex Fernandez) is a convicted felon. Martin fatally shoots a child sex trafficker, and both  Vivian and he must keep quiet to keep their jobs. Jack makes a last-ditch attempt to save his marriage by moving to Chicago with his family, giving Vivian a long-awaited promotion to his post, but at the last minute, his wife Maria (Talia Balsam) leaves without him, taking their daughters Hannah and Kate (Vanessa and Laura Marano) with her.

Following a campaign by the conservative group the Parents Television Council, CBS was fined a record $3.6 million for indecency for the sixth episode "Our Sons and Daughters", which centered around a teenaged orgy. CBS argued that the episode "featured an important and socially relevant storyline warning parents to exercise greater supervision of their teenaged children."

Season 3

Vivian loses her promotion when Jack returns to his job, causing some commotion among the team.  She also experiences heart trouble that endangers her life and her career, and undergoes risky surgery. Martin and Samantha begin dating secretly, and because of disagreements between them on whether or not to reveal it to the rest of the team, it ends badly.  Jack undergoes a brutal custody battle with his ex-wife.  Danny has to confront his traumatic past, and Rafael.  The season ends with a cliffhanger as a hired mercenary opens fire on Martin and Danny's car while they transport a prisoner.

Season 4

After barely surviving the gun battle that ended season three, Martin must recover from near-fatal gunshot wounds while Danny battles post-traumatic stress disorder (PTSD). Stretched for help, the team gets a new member, Elena Delgado, a former NYPD vice-squad officer with an aggressive, streetwise attitude. She has a past connection to Danny, the nature of which is unknown until season five. Martin develops an addiction to painkillers, and Jack begins dating Anne Cassidy (Mary Elizabeth Mastrantonio), the widow of a former mentor killed in the line of duty.

Season 5

Anne miscarries and abruptly breaks up with Jack. Danny and Elena begin dating, while her ex-husband Carlos Aguilar (Jsu Garcia) sues for custody of their daughter Sofie (Ashlyn Sanchez), and later abducts her. More about Samantha's difficult past is revealed, including her strained relationships with her mother Patricia (Tess Harper) and older sister Emily (Molly Price). Jack is abducted and tortured by a psychotic woman, but initially appears to show few effects. At the end of the season, Carlos is freed, leaving the team worried about Elena's safety, and a serial kidnapper appears to be preying on young women.

Season 6

Vivian is put in charge of a task force to locate the serial kidnapper, who is part of a sex-trafficking ring. Samantha discovers that she is pregnant from a one-night stand with a bartender at the time, Brian Donovan (Adam Kaufman), and by the end of the season, he waives paternal rights because of what Jack digs up on him and Sam confronting him about it, and she gives birth to her son Finn. Jack begins a pattern of roughing up suspects and intimidating people to make them talk, which appears to be related to PTSD. He also gets into a dangerous situation without backup and is nearly killed, and becomes overly involved in the life of a teenager he saved from the sex traffickers. In the season finale, he is demoted and put in mandatory therapy with Dr. Clare Bryson (Linda Hunt).

This season also contained a two-part crossover episode with CSI: Crime Scene Investigation, as Jack and Gil Grissom (William Petersen) and their teams track down a serial killer responsible for the disappearance of a boy six years ago. Both episodes are included on the DVD collection for CSI'''s eighth season.Without a Trace completed 12 episodes of season six before the 2007-2008 WGA strike. Because the show's writing staff all joined the strike,  no more new episodes were made until the issue was settled. Once the strike ended, the show returned on April 3, 2008, with six episodes.

Season 7

The seventh and final season begins with the team getting a new boss, Clark Medina (Steven Weber), but he shortly gives Jack his position back. Jack and Sam's relationship rekindles. Jack takes custody of his older daughter Hannah. Brian decides to be a father to Finn.  Martin gets involved with Kim Marcus (Vanessa Marcil), but he eventually finds out that she was involved in a crime and arrests her.  Jack and Sam mutually end their romantic relationship for good.  Jack reconciles with Hannah.  Sam begins living with Brian to raise Finn together.  The team goes to Danny and Elena's wedding.

Episodes

Crossover with CSI: Crime Scene Investigation

In "Where and Why", Gil Grissom comes to New York to help the FBI track down a serial killer after Jack Malone comes to Las Vegas to help the CSIs with a murder victim in "Who and What".

 Reception 
The series received generally positive reviews during its original broadcast.

 U.S. television ratings 
Seasonal rankings (based on average total viewers per episode) of Without A Trace on CBS:Note: Each U.S. network television season starts in late September and ends in late May, which coincides with the completion of May sweeps. Awards and nominations 
During the series run, it received 1 Golden Globe award nomination, 5 Primetime Emmy award nomination, and 3 Screen Actors Guild award nominations.

Home media

Season releasesWithout A Trace Season 1 has been released on Region 1, Region 2 and Region 4 DVD. Season 2 (region 1 DVD) was released on March 13, 2007. Seasons 3 and 4 were released on Region 1 DVDs in 2012 under the Warner Archive "Manufactured On Demand" model. Season 5 was released in Region 1 on November 27, 2012. Season 6 was released in Regions 1 and 4 on May 7, 2013. Season 7 was released on April 29, 2014 on Region 1. All seven seasons are not available in Canada.

Seasons 1–6 have all been released under Region 2 encoding, while Seasons 1-4 have been released under Region 4 encoding.

Syndication
From 2005 to 2009, after a long run of weekday back-to-back episodes on TNT, Without a Trace reruns were moved to a graveyard slot in early morning, then removed totally from TNT's lineup.

In August 2020, Paramount Network began airing reruns of the show on August 14, 2020, making a return of the series in syndication for the first time since TNT removed it from its lineup in 2009.Without a Trace is currently available for streaming on HBO Max starting March 1, 2021.

See alsoCSI: Crime Scene InvestigationCSI: MiamiCSI: NYCold CaseMissing PersonsCriminal MindsLaw & OrderLaw & Order: Criminal IntentLaw & Order: Special Victims Unit''

References

External links

 
 Official website on TNT
 Without a Trace on MyNetworkTV
 

 
2002 American television series debuts
2009 American television series endings
2000s American crime drama television series
2000s American mystery television series
Kidnapping in television
Television series by Warner Bros. Television Studios